The Odesa Soviet Republic (OSR;) was a short-lived Soviet republic formed on  from parts of the Kherson and Bessarabia Governorates of the former Russian Empire.

Brief description 

The republic was proclaimed during the Bolshevik invasion of Ukraine immediately before Bolshevik forces pushed the Ukrainian government out of Kiev and Sfatul Țării proclaimed the independence of the Moldavian Democratic Republic. The Odesa Soviet's governing body was the Rumcherod, formed in May 1917 shortly after the February Revolution. After its Second Congress, the OSR's Soviet was chaired by Vladimir Yudovsky. He had been installed after a pro-Bolshevik coup d'état organized by the Narkom Nikolai Krylenko.

In January 1918, Yudovsky was appointed Chairman of the local Council of the People's Commissars and formed a government that included Bolsheviks, anarchists and members of the Socialist-Revolutionary Party. The government proclaimed Odesa a free city and pledged allegiance to the Bolshevik government in Petrograd. The following month, the government was liquidated by Mikhail Muravyov and merged with the regional Central Executive Committee Rumcherod.

Political instability meant that the OSR was not recognized by any other government, including Russian Bolsheviks, during its brief existence. The Republic failed to stop the Romanian occupation of Bessarabia, a region to which it laid claim. It ceased to exist altogether when it was sacked by German and Austro-Hungarian troops on 13 March 1918, two months after its creation, following the Treaty of Brest-Litovsk between the Central Powers, Ukrainian People's Republic and Petrograd Sovnarkom. The government and army evacuated first to Nikolayev, then to Sevastopol and finally to Rostov-on-Don.

See also 
Mishka Yaponchik, sponsor of the city and anti-bourgeoisie fighter.
Special Odesa Army
Hungarian–Romanian War of 1919
Rumcherod, the governing body of the Odesa Soviet Republic.
Iona Yakir
Iași–Don March

External links
 Odesa Soviet Republic on odesskiy.com
 Odesa Soviet Republic on leksika.com.ua

History of Odesa Oblast
Russian Revolution in Ukraine
Early Soviet republics
Former socialist republics
1918 in Ukraine
Communism in Ukraine
Post–Russian Empire states
Political history of Ukraine
Former unrecognized countries
History of Ukraine (1918–1991)
1918 establishments in Ukraine
1918 disestablishments in Ukraine
Russian-speaking countries and territories
States and territories established in 1918
States and territories disestablished in 1918
Russian irredentism